The following is a list of Texas Longhorns football seasons.

Seasons

References

Texas
Texas Longhorns football seasons
Texas Longhorns football seasons